was a Japanese Neo-Confucian philosopher and writer during the Edo period.

His most well-known student was Hayashi Razan (1583–1657).

Life 
He was born in Harima Province (now Miki City, Hyogo Prefecture) on February 8, 1561 to the Reizei family. At the age of seven or eight he was sent to the Shōkoku-ji temple to become a Zen Buddhist priest. There, he studied Confucianism alongside his Zen studies. In 1596, Fujiwara attempted to travel to Ming China in order to study under an authentic Confucian master, but inclement weather forced the party to turn back. Fujiwara learned more about Neo-Confucianism from the Korean scholar Kang Hang.

See also 
Neo-Confucianism in Japan

References

1561 births
1619 deaths
Japanese Confucianists
16th-century Japanese philosophers
Japanese writers of the Edo period
Rinzai Buddhists
17th-century Japanese philosophers